Alexander Brown (23 February 1830 – 22 January 1913) was a New Zealand marine engineer, foundry and shipping company manager. He was born in Larkhall, Lanarkshire, Scotland on 23 February 1830.

References

1830 births
1913 deaths
Scottish emigrants to New Zealand
19th-century New Zealand engineers
20th-century New Zealand engineers